The Louisville, Harrods Creek and Westport Railway was a 19th-century railway company in the U.S. state of Kentucky. Its first president was James Callahan. It was organized by Louisvillian businessmen in 1870, began construction and operation of the  narrow gauge railway in 1872, and failed in 1879 owing to the era's Long Depression. The line then gave up hope of connecting to Westport or beyond and reincorporated as the more modest Louisville, Harrods Creek and Westport Railroad, which simply continued service along the existing track.

The railroad began at First and River roads in Louisville and ran along Fulton Street. The company charter was amended to permit consolidation with other lines (including a proposed "Westport, Carrollton and Covington Railroad" expansion) but the line's failure ended those plans.

The line was responsible for the settlement and name of the Louisville suburb of Prospect. It later made up part of the Louisville and Nashville network and its former rights-of-way currently form parts of the class-I CSX Transportation system.

See also
 List of Kentucky railroads
 Louisville, Harrods Creek and Westport Railroad

References

Defunct Kentucky railroads
Defunct companies based in Louisville, Kentucky
Transportation in Louisville, Kentucky
Narrow gauge railroads in Kentucky
3 ft gauge railways in the United States
Railway companies established in 1870
Railway companies disestablished in 1879